The 2010 ACC Trophy Challenge was a cricket tournament in Thailand, taking place between 4–11 December 2010. It gives Associate and Affiliate members of the Asian Cricket Council experience of international one-day cricket and also helps forms an essential part of regional rankings.  The tournament was won by the Maldives who defeated Saudi Arabia by 1 wicket.

Teams

Squads

Group stages

Group A

Group B

Semi-finals

Play-offs

7th place play-off

5th place play-off

3rd place play-off

Final

Final Placings

Statistics

References

ACC Trophy
ACC Trophy Challenge
ACC Trophy Challenge
International cricket competitions in Thailand